Nototylinae is a subfamily of beetles in the family Carabidae. It contains the single genus Nototylus with two species, Nototylus fryi and Nototylus balli which was described in 2020. The first described species fryi was represented by a single specimen from Espiritu Santo where the forests were converted for plantations of sugarcane or cacao, and for cattle rearing. The species is considered likely extinct.

References

Monotypic insect taxa
Carabidae subfamilies